Alice Graham Baker (October 18, 1864  May 9, 1932) was an American civic leader, social worker, and philanthropist. She was the founding president of the Houston Settlement Association. She was married to Captain James A. Baker, who collaborated with her in civic ventures. She was the grandmother of James Addison Baker III, former United States Secretary of State and former Secretary of Treasury.

Family life
Alice Graham was born on October 18, 1864 to Francis Hughes and Mary Augusta (Wilson) Graham in Waco, Texas. On January 10, 1883, Alice married James Addison Baker, a Houston attorney in his father’s firm, Baker & Botts. The couple resided in Houston, where they grew into a family with four sons and two daughters: Frank, Alice, James Jr., Walter, Ruth, and Malcolm.

Philanthropy and social work

Baker started her civic engagement in 1893 at a meeting held at the Shearn Methodist Church in support of the Kezia DePelchin Faith Home. DePelchin sheltered orphaned children, but died in January 1893. Ruth House (wife of Thomas William House Sr.) led this group in founding the DePelchin Faith Home Association. Baker founded the Houston Settlement Association in February 1907. She and Captain Baker composed a constitution for the nascent organization. In the next meeting, the charter members tapped Baker to serve as the first president of the Houston Settlement Association, a post she held until 1918. Based on Jane Addams and the Hull House model, volunteers resided in buildings in disadvantaged areas to help immigrants assimilate. They first established a settlement near Rusk Elementary School in a working-class area in Houston’s Second Ward, where many Mexican immigrants were living. The Houston Settlement Association created subsidies for kindergarten and vocational training for adults.

Baker established a standard of accountability, filing a detailed report for the Houston Settlement Association each year. These reports included articulation of the organization’s values, goals, and objectives; an explanation of the settlement movement; a listing of the organization’s officers, employees, and volunteers; and a financial statement. After 1910, Baker obtained permission from the school board to move the headquarters of the Rusk Settlement House inside the Rusk School, and continued to expand their programs for several years. Meanwhile, the Houston Settlement Association opened the Brackenridge Settlement in 1916.

Baker and her husband worked together to advocate for urban playgrounds, securing some donated land on Louisiana Street from the Rice Institute. She recruited and mentored Corinne Stephenson Tsanoff, who later assumed many of Baker’s leadership positions.

Death and legacy

Baker died on May 9, 1932 in Houston and was interred at Glenwood Cemetery.

The Houston Settlement Association continued its work after Baker’s death. From 1956, it was known as Neighborhood Centers Association of Houston and Harris County, Inc.; and from 2017, it is known as BakerRipley.

References

Bibliography

External links
 

1864 births
1932 deaths
People from Waco, Texas
People from Houston
Settlement houses
Burials at Glenwood Cemetery (Houston, Texas)